Horton Point may refer to:
 Horton Point Light - a lighthouse on the north side of Eastern Long Island, New York near Southold.
 Horton Point LLC - a quantitative investment firm in New York City.
 Horton Point (horse) - the winner of the 1994 Badminton Horse Trials.